John Charles Barrett (born October 28, 1953), known professionally as Desmond Child, is an American songwriter and producer. He was inducted into the Songwriters Hall of Fame in 2008.

His hits as a songwriter include Kiss's "I Was Made for Lovin' You"; Joan Jett & the Blackhearts' "I Hate Myself for Loving You"; Bon Jovi's "You Give Love a Bad Name", "Livin' on a Prayer", "Bad Medicine", and "Born to Be My Baby"; Aerosmith's "Dude (Looks Like a Lady)", "Angel", "What It Takes" and "Crazy"; Cher's "We All Sleep Alone" and "Just Like Jesse James"; Alice Cooper's "Poison"; Michael Bolton's "How Can We Be Lovers?"; and Ricky Martin's "The Cup of Life" and "Livin' la Vida Loca".

Career 
Child's career started when he formed an R&B-influenced pop rock band, Desmond Child & Rouge in 1975 with singers Myriam Valle, Maria Vidal, and Diana Grasselli, backed by hired musicians. The band was known for their inclusion on the soundtrack to The Warriors in 1979, with the song "Last of an Ancient Breed", and for the song "Our Love is Insane", which charted at No. 51 in the Billboard Hot 100. Their two albums received positive reviews but sold poorly and the group disbanded in 1980. One member, Maria Vidal, had a hit in 1985 with "Body Rock".

Child then worked with songwriter Bob Crewe for two years.

Artists Child has worked with include Kiss, Cher, Aerosmith, Bon Jovi, Bonnie Tyler, Dream Theater, Roxette, Ricky Martin, Selena Gomez, and Kelly Clarkson. Desmond is credited with discovering Troy Curtis Tuminelli and recommending him to Edgardo Diaz before Tuminelli landed in Menudo, and, eventually, on Guiding Light. He was the key partner in Alice Cooper's album Trash (1989). He was also responsible for co-writing the Ratt album Detonator (1990).

Child scored a Billboard Top 40 hit in 1991 as a solo artist with "Love on a Rooftop", a song he had co-written with Diane Warren, originally recorded by Ronnie Spector, and later by Cher. "Love on a Rooftop" also peaked at number 55 on the Australian ARIA Charts.

He produced Meat Loaf's album Bat Out of Hell III: The Monster Is Loose, and co-wrote six of its songs.

Child wrote the song "Believe in Me" for Bonnie Tyler in 2012 and one year later it was selected as the Eurovision Song Contest entry for the United Kingdom, where it finished in 19th place in the final. Following the contest, Tyler received two Eurovision Song Contest Radio Awards for Best Song and Best Singer, making her the first UK representative to win the award. Child was to participate in the Eurovision Song Contest again as a songwriter in 2022, co-writing and producing the Finnish entry, Jezebel, performed by the Rasmus. The song would go on to finish 21st in the final.

Child was inducted into the Songwriters Hall of Fame in 2008. In 2013, he co-founded the Latin Songwriters Hall of Fame along with fellow Cuban-American composer Rudy Pérez. Desmond's autobiography, Livin' on a Prayer: Big Songs Big Life with David Ritz, is being released in early 2020.

Personal life 
Child lives in Nashville, Tennessee with his husband, Curtis Shaw, and their twin sons. Child and Shaw's struggle to have a baby via surrogacy is recounted in the documentary Two: The Story of Roman & Nyro.

The track "The Truth Comes Out" from Desmond Child & Rouge's second album Runners in the Night (1979) was written about 'coming out' to his girlfriend and Rouge bandmate, Maria Vidal.

The song "A Ray of Hope", written by Don Paul Yowell, was recorded by Child as a tribute to Child's younger brother, Joey (b. Joseph Stephen), who died in January 1991 of AIDS-related complications.

He is the biological son of Hungarian baron Joseph S. Marfy and Cuban songwriter Elena Casals.  Child did not discover that Marfy was his biological father until he was 18 years old.  Until that time, he had believed that his father was John Frederick Barrett, Casals' husband at the time of his birth, and for whom he was named.  Through his Hungarian ancestry, Child received dual American-Hungarian citizenship in 2016. Child recently released "The Steps of Champions" a song he wrote for the Hungarian government as the official anthem of the sixtieth anniversary commemorations of the Hungarian Revolution of 1956. In 2016 he received Artisjus Lifetime Achievement Award.

Discography

Desmond Child & Rouge 
 Desmond Child & Rouge (Capitol Records) (1979)
 "Our Love Is Insane" (No. 51, 1979)
 Runners in the Night (Capitol Records) (1979)

Solo 
 The Warriors: The Original Motion Picture Soundtrack (A&M Records) (1979)
 Song: "Last of an Ancient Breed"
 Discipline (Elektra Records) (1991)

For and with other artists

See also 
 List of songs written by Desmond Child

References

External links 
 
 
 Desmond Child Interview NAMM Oral History Library (2017)

1953 births
Record producers from Florida
American writers of Cuban descent
American people of Hungarian descent
Hungarian people of American descent
Hungarian people of Cuban descent
Naturalized citizens of Hungary
LGBT Hispanic and Latino American people
LGBT people from Florida
LGBT record producers
American gay musicians
American gay writers
Gay songwriters
Gay composers
Hungarian LGBT songwriters
American LGBT songwriters
Living people
Hungarian gay musicians
Hungarian gay writers
Musicians from Gainesville, Florida
Musicians from Miami
Songwriters from Florida
Writers from Gainesville, Florida
Writers from Miami
20th-century American male musicians
21st-century American male musicians
Aerosmith
Bon Jovi
20th-century American LGBT people
21st-century American LGBT people
20th-century Hungarian LGBT people
21st-century Hungarian LGBT people